Innsbrucker EV or EV Innsbruck was an ice hockey team based in Innsbruck, Austria. They competed in the Austrian Hockey League until 1993 and won the Austrian Championship seven times. Their home arena was Olympiahalle Innsbruck.

The organization was disbanded entirely after the 1993–94 season. HC Innsbruck was founded in 1994 and, through not a continuation of the original franchise, is regarded as EV Innsbruck’s successor.

Notable alumni 
Years active with EV Innsbruck listed alongside names
 Alain Daigle, 1981–82
 Chris Felix, 1991–1993
 François Guay, 1991–1993
/ Greg Holst, 1989–1992
 Sergei Alekseevich Kapustin, 1986–1987
 Kevin LaVallée, 1987–1990
 Martin Lindner, 1982–1994
 Martin Platzer, 1983–1985
/ Poul Popiel, 1978–79
 Gerald Rauchenwald, 1986–1991
/ Adelbert Saint John, 1975–1978 (player-coach)
 Viktor Ivanovich Shalimov, 1987–88
 Christian Perthaler, 1988–1993

Head coaches 

 / Adelbert Saint John, 1975–1978 (player-coach)
  Gerhard Kießling, 1985
  Blair MacDonald, 1986–87
  Rudolf Killias, 1987–1989
  Gerhard Kießling, 1990–91
  Václav Nedomanský, 1990–91
  Miroslav Berek, 1991–1993

References

External links 
Team information and statistics from HockeyDB.com, and EliteProspects.com, and HockeyArchives.info (in French) 

Defunct ice hockey teams in Austria
Alpenliga teams
Ice hockey clubs established in 1925
Sports clubs disestablished in 1994
1925 establishments in Austria
1994 disestablishments in Austria
Former Austrian Hockey League teams